Count Kuno von Klebelsberg de Thumburg (13 November 1875 – 12 October 1932) was a Hungarian politician who served as Minister of the Interior and Minister of Culture of the Kingdom of Hungary between the two world wars.

Klebelsberg was born in Magyarpécska, Austria-Hungary (today Pecica, Romania). After World War I, the Treaty of Trianon, and the ravages of the civil war, Klebelsberg assumed the position of Minister of the Interior in 1921, a post which he filled until the following year. Afterwards, he served as Minister of Culture (1922–1931) and introduced many educational reforms throughout Hungary. Klebelsberg helped create elementary schools in the countryside, began the modernisation of numerous universities, and created the foreign Hungarian cultural institute Collegium Hungaricum to raise awareness of Hungarian culture in other countries.

Klebelsberg is also famous for introducing a progressive policy on scholarships for university students.

Klebelsberg, however, was controversial with his ideology of Hungarian supremacy, which attributed superior value to Hungarian ethnic culture over the minority ethnic cultures of the former Austro-Hungarian Monarchy (Serb, Slovak, Romanian, Jewish etc.). After the Treaty of Trianon, Klebelsberg's ideology and educational reforms directly served the territorial revisionist and chauvinistic claims of the Hungarian regimes during Miklós Horthy's reign as a regent. Klebelsberg was antisemitic, blaming the entire Hungarian Jewry for the bourgeois liberal and communist revolutions, and the governments of 1918 and 1919, respectively, for the loss of territories associated with the Treaty of Trianon. In a dramatic outburst in 1924, he asked the Jews to give back Greater Hungary, promising in exchange to lift the numerus clausus, the first anti-Jewish act introduced in 20th century Europe.

References

External links
 

1875 births
1932 deaths
People from Pecica
Hungarian people of German descent
Hungarian Interior Ministers
Education ministers of Hungary